"The Fix" is a song by American rapper Nelly featuring American singer Jeremih. The track is produced by DJ Mustard and Mike Free and interpolates Marvin Gaye's 1982 hit song "Sexual Healing". The song came to fruition as a result of Nelly and DJ Mustard having the same publisher, who made sure all references to the interpolation contained within "The Fix" were cleared before it was released.

Background
The song premiered on August 6, 2015, and was released for digital download on August 14.

Commercial performance
"The Fix" debuted on the Billboard Hot 100 chart dated September 5, 2015, at number 86. Its chart debut was fueled by first-week digital download sales of 42,000 copies. As of June 2016, "The Fix" has been certified Platinum from RIAA for selling 1,000,000 copies domestically.

Music video
The accompanying music video for the track was directed by Aristotle and filmed at the Sheats Goldstein Residence in Beverly Crest, Los Angeles, California. It was released on September 24, 2015.

Track listing
Digital download
"The Fix"  (Explicit) – 2:53
"The Fix"  (Clean) – 2:53

Balkan Beat Box Remix – single
"The Fix"  [Balkan Beat Box Remix] [Clean] – 2:48

Balkan Beat Box Remix – single
"The Fix"  [Balkan Beat Box Remix] [Explicit] – 2:48

Charts

Weekly charts

Year-end charts

Certifications

Release history

References

External links

2015 songs
2015 singles
Nelly songs
Jeremih songs
Songs written by Mustard (record producer)
Songs written by Nelly
Songs written by Marvin Gaye
Song recordings produced by Mustard (record producer)
Songs written by Jeremih